Nolubabalo Ndzundzu (born 21 December 1977) is a South African former cricketer who played as a right-arm medium bowler. She appeared in one Test match and 16 One Day Internationals for South Africa between 2000 and 2005. She played domestic cricket for Border.

Ndzundzu was the first black woman to play cricket for South Africa. In July 2021, she told a Social Justice and Nation-Building hearing convened by Cricket South Africa that she had faced humiliation and discrimination during her international career. On tours, other members of the national team had wanted to change rooms if they were roomed with her, and had laughed at her poor command of English.

After Ndzundzu retired as a cricketer, she became a police officer, and, subsequently, the selection convenor for the Border women's cricket team.

References

External links
 
 

1977 births
Living people
Sportspeople from Qonce
South African women cricketers
South Africa women Test cricketers
South Africa women One Day International cricketers
Border women cricketers